Titu is a town in Dâmbovița County, Muntenia, Romania, with a population of 9,658 .

Location
The town in located in the southern part of the county, in the center of the Wallachian Plain.
Pitești. Titu îs surrounded by several communes: Produlești and Braniștea to the north, Odobești and Potlogi to the south, Conțești and Lungulețu to the east, and Costeștii din Vale to the west.

Zones and administration
Titu is divided into three main zones:
 Titu-gară – The main part of the city, it contains the town hall, the main school, the train station and most important buildings.
 Titu-târg – A rural zone which includes the town's library and the second school. It was also the former center town.
 Sălcuța – The smallest zone and a village in its own right, it is rural and features a church. It is also the place where the bâlci is held.

The town administers five other villages: Fusea, Hagioaica, Mereni, Plopu and Sălcuța.

Industry
The French automobile manufacturer Renault is operating a technical centre near the town of Titu, that is used for testing and optimizing vehicles of the Dacia brand. It became operational in September 2010 and the cost of the investment raised to 166 million euro. It has 600 employees and is located halfway between the Mioveni factory and the research centre in Bucharest.

The town holds an annual fair on September 14.

Natives
Dimitrie Dimăncescu (1896–1984), diplomat
Ioan Dimăncescu  (1898–1951), army officer
Ion Miu (born 1955), virtuoso cimbalom player

References

Towns in Romania
Populated places in Dâmbovița County
Localities in Muntenia